Conflict of Interest may refer to:
 For conflicts of interest generally, see conflict of interest
 "Conflicts of Interest" (Babylon 5), a 1997 episode of Babylon 5
 Conflict of Interest (album), an album by Ghetts
 Conflict of Interest (EP), an EP by Darkwood
 "A Conflict of Interest", a 1987 episode of Yes, Prime Minister
 "A Conflict of Interests" (Life on Mars), an episode of Life on Mars
 Conflict of Interest (novel), a legal thriller by David Crump
 Conflict of Interest (film), a 1993 independent film directed by Gary Davis
 Conflict of interest editing on Wikipedia